Andrew Phang Boon Leong  (born 15 December 1957) is a Singaporean judge in the Supreme Court.

Early life and education 
Phang was born in 1957 in Singapore. Phang received his Bachelor of Laws (first class honours) from the University of Singapore in 1982, before earning his Master of Laws and Doctor of Juridical Science from Harvard Law School in 1984 and 1988 respectively.

Career

Legal academic

Between 1982 and 2000, Phang taught at the National University of Singapore Faculty of Law, and was appointed Professor of Law in 1999. He was appointed Professor of Law at the Singapore Management University (SMU) School of Law in 2000, and made Chairman of the Department of Law at SMU's Lee Kong Chian School of Business in 2001.

In 2004, together with Tan Cheng Han, he was one of the first two legal academics in Singapore to be conferred the title of senior counsel.

Supreme Court

Phang was appointed Judicial Commissioner in January 2005, Judge of the High Court in December 2005, and Judge of Appeal on 28 February 2006. At 48 years old, he was the youngest person to have been appointed a Judge of Appeal.

He is one of the leading authorities in contract law in Singapore and the Commonwealth. He was appointed vice-president of the Court of Appeal with effect from 28 September 2017 following his predecessor Chao Hick Tin's retirement.

Phang will retire as a Justice of the Court of Appeal on his 65th birthday on 15 December 2022. He will continue to hear specific cases as a Senior Judge appointed for a fixed term, from 2 January 2023 to 4 January 2024.

Cases 
Cases in which Phang sat as a judge include:

 Turf Club Auto Emporium v Yeo Boong Hua [2018] SGCA 44 — concerning 'negotiating damages' / Wrotham Park damages

Personal life
Phang's wife is Phang Sock Yong, an economics professor at the Singapore Management University. He has two daughters.

Selected works

Books 
 Andrew B.L. Phang & Goh Yihan, Contract Law in Singapore, Kluwer Law International, 2012,

Articles 

 "Implied terms in English law — some recent developments" (1993) Journal of Business Law 242
 "The Challenge of Principled Gap Filling — A Study of Implied Terms in a Comparative Context" (2014) Journal of Business Law 263

References

External links
Andrew Phang's CV on the Supreme Court website

1957 births
Living people
Academic staff of the National University of Singapore Faculty of Law
Anglo-Chinese School alumni
Academic staff of Singapore Management University School of Law
Harvard Law School alumni
National University of Singapore alumni
Singaporean Judges of Appeal
Singaporean people of Chinese descent
Singaporean Senior Counsel